Giulia Arcioni (born 21 March 1986 in Rome) is a track and field sprint athlete who competes internationally for Italy.

Biography
Arcioni represented Italy at the 2008 Summer Olympics in Beijing. She competed at the 4x100 metres relay together with Anita Pistone, Vincenza Calì and Audrey Alloh. In their first round heat they were however disqualified and eliminated for the final. She won two medals, to senior level, with the national relay team at the International athletics competitions.

National records
 4×100 metres relay: 43.04 ( Annecy, 21 June 2008) - with Anita Pistone, Audrey Alloh, Vincenza Calì - current holder

Achievements

See also
 Italy national relay team
 Italian all-time lists - 4x100 metres relay

References

External links
 

1986 births
Living people
Olympic athletes of Italy
Athletes (track and field) at the 2008 Summer Olympics
Italian female sprinters
Athletes from Rome
Athletics competitors of Gruppo Sportivo Forestale
Athletics competitors of Centro Sportivo Carabinieri
Mediterranean Games silver medalists for Italy
Athletes (track and field) at the 2009 Mediterranean Games
Universiade medalists in athletics (track and field)
Mediterranean Games medalists in athletics
Universiade gold medalists for Italy
Competitors at the 2007 Summer Universiade
Medalists at the 2009 Summer Universiade
Olympic female sprinters